Richard A. Feely is an American chemical oceanographer currently at NOAA and an Elected Fellow of the American Association for the Advancement of Science.

Education
He earned his Ph.D at Texas A&M University in 1974.

Research
His interests are ocean acidification, CO2 and carbon cycling. His highest paper is Anthropogenic ocean acidification over the twenty-first century and its impact on calcifying organisms at 3272 times, according to Google Scholar.

Publications
Chatterjee, A., M.M. Gierach, A.J. Sutton, R.A. Feely, D. Crisp, A. Eldering, M.R. Gunson, C.W. O’Dell, B.B. Stephens, and D.S. Schimel (2017): Influence of El Niño on atmospheric CO2 over the tropical Pacific Ocean: Findings from NASA’s OCO-2 mission. Science, 358(6360), eaam5776, doi: 10.1126/science.aam5776. 
Lindquist, A., A. Sutton, A. Devol, A. Winans, A. Coyne, B. Bodenstein, B. Curry, B. Herrmann, B. Sackmann, B. Tyler, C. Maloy, C. Greengrove, C. Fanshier, C. Krembs, C. Sabine, C. Cook, C. Hard, C. Greene, D. Lowry, D. Harvell, E. McPhee-Shaw, E. Haphey, G. Hannach, H. Bohlmann, H. Burgess, I. Smith, I. Kemp, J. Newton, J. Borchert, J. Mickett, J. Apple, J. Bos, J. Parrish, J. Ruffner, J. Keister, J. Masura, K. Devitt, K. Bumbaco, K. Stark, L. Hermanson, L. Claassen, L. Swanson, M. Burger, M. Schmidt, M. McCartha, M. Peacock, M. Eisenlord, M. Keyzers, N. Christman, N. Hamel, N. Burnett, N. Bond, O. Graham, P. Biondo, P. Hodum, R. Wilborn, R.A. Feely, S. Pearson, S. Alin, S. Albertson, S. Moore, S. Jaeger, S. Pool, S. Musielwicz, T. King, T. Good, T. Jones, T. Ross, T. Sandell, T. Burks, V. Trainer, V. Bowes, W. Ruef, and W. Eash-Loucks (2017): Puget Sound Marine Waters: 2016 Overview. S. Moore, R. Wold, K. Stark, J. Bos, P. Williams, N. Hamel, A. Edwards, C. Krembs, and J. Newton (eds.), NOAA Northwest Fisheries Science Center for the Puget Sound Ecosystem Monitoring Program’s (PSEMP) Marine Waters Workgroup
Newton, J., T. Klinger, R.A. Feely, and Washington Marine Resources Advisory Council (2017): 2017 Addendum to Ocean Acidification: From Knowledge to Action, Washington State’s Strategic Response. EnviroIssues (ed.), Seattle, Washington.

References

External links

Year of birth missing (living people)
Living people
Intergovernmental Panel on Climate Change contributing authors
Fellows of the American Association for the Advancement of Science
University of Washington faculty
Texas A&M University alumni
American oceanographers